Alain Péréa (born 5 June 1971) is a French politician of La République En Marche! (LREM) who was elected to the French National Assembly on 18 June 2017, representing the department of Aude.

Political career
In parliament, Péréa serves on the Committee on Sustainable Development. In July 2019, he announced his candidacy to succeed Barbara Pompili the committee’s chair; in an internal vote, he lost against Pompili.

In addition to his committee assignments, Péréa is part of the French-Croatian Parliamentary Friendship Group and the French delegation to the Parliamentary Assembly of the Union for the Mediterranean. He also co-chairs the Hunting and Territories group.

Other activities
 FranceAgriMer, Member of the Supervisory Board

Political positions
In July 2019, Péréa voted in favor of the French ratification of the European Union’s Comprehensive Economic and Trade Agreement (CETA) with Canada. In 2020, Péréa was one of the LREM members who endorsed an animal welfare referendum calling a for ban on some hunting practices that are deemed "cruel".

See also
 2017 French legislative election

External links
 His page on the National Assembly website

References

1971 births
Living people
People from Béziers
Deputies of the 15th National Assembly of the French Fifth Republic
La République En Marche! politicians